The 2014 Tirreno–Adriatico was the 49th edition of the Tirreno–Adriatico cycling stage race, often known as the Race of the Two Seas. It started on 12 March in Donoratico and ended on 18 March in San Benedetto del Tronto, and consisted of seven stages, including a team time trial to begin the race and an individual time trial to conclude it. It was the third race of the 2014 UCI World Tour season.

In the race's other classifications, 's Peter Sagan was the winner of the red jersey for the points classification, amassing the highest number of points during stages at intermediate sprints and stage finishes, and Marco Canola was the winner of the mountains classification for the  team. Quintana also won the white jersey for the young rider classification, as he was the highest placed rider born in 1989 or later, while the  squad won the team classification, placing riders Jean-Christophe Péraud and Domenico Pozzovivo inside the top ten overall.

There were some changes further down the GC as a result of the time trial though as Jean-Christophe Péraud moved above Julián Arredondo in to 4th place and Michele Scarponi moved up to the top ten as a result of a strong ride.

Race overview

Teams
As Tirreno–Adriatico was a UCI World Tour event, all 18 UCI ProTeams were invited automatically and obligated to send a squad. Four other squads were given wildcard places to the race, completing the 22-team peloton.

The 22 teams that competed in the race are:

Stages

Stage 1
12 March 2014 — Donoratico to San Vincenzo,  team time trial (TTT)

Stage 2
13 March 2014 — San Vincenzo to Cascina,

Stage 3
14 March 2014 — Cascina to Arezzo,

Stage 4
15 March 2014 — Indicatore to Cittareale,

Stage 5
16 March 2014 — Amatrice to Guardiagrele,

Stage 6
17 March 2014 — Bucchianico to Porto Sant'Elpidio,

Stage 7
18 March 2014 — San Benedetto del Tronto,  individual time trial (ITT)

Classification leadership table

References

External links
 

Tirreno–Adriatico
Tirreno-Adriatico
Tirreno-Adriatico